"Take Me to the Clouds Above" is a song by British dance group LMC (credited as LMC vs U2). It peaked at number one on the UK Singles Chart for two weeks in February 2004. The song interpolates Whitney Houston's 1986 hit "How Will I Know" (using only the first four lines) and samples U2's 1987 hit "With or Without You". The vocals in the song were performed by Rachel McFarlane.

Track listings
UK maxi-single (CDGLOBE313)
 "Take Me to the Clouds Above" (radio edit)
 "Take Me to the Clouds Above" (The Mash Up Kids Remix)
 "Take Me to the Clouds Above" (extended mix)
 "Take Me to the Clouds Above" (Audiolush Remix)
 "Take Me to the Clouds Above" (Lee S Remix)
 "Take Me to the Clouds Above" (Flip & Fill Remix)

UK CD single (CXGLOBE313)
 "Take Me to the Clouds Above" (radio edit)
 "The Feeling"

US 12-inch single (UL 1207-6)
A1. "Take Me to the Clouds Above" (extended)
A2. "Take Me to the Clouds Above" (Lee S Remix)
B1. "Take Me to the Clouds Above" (Mash Up Kids Remix)
B2. "The Feeling"

Australian CD single (CSR CD5 0444)
 "Take Me to the Clouds Above" (radio edit) – 2:50
 "Take Me to the Clouds Above" (The Mash Up Kids Remix) – 7:31
 "Take Me to the Clouds Above" (Lee S Remix) – 6:01
 "Take Me to the Clouds Above" (Audiolush Remix) – 6:21
 "Take Me to the Clouds Above" (Flip & Fill Remix) – 6:37
 "Take Me to the Clouds Above" (Scott B Remix) – 5:19
 "The Feeling" – 5:17

Charts and certifications

Weekly charts

Year-end charts

Certifications

References

2003 songs
2004 debut singles
All Around the World Productions singles
British electronic songs
Number-one singles in Scotland
Songs written by Adam Clayton
Songs written by Bono
Songs written by the Edge
Songs written by George Merrill (songwriter)
Songs written by Larry Mullen Jr.
Songs written by Narada Michael Walden
Songs written by Shannon Rubicam
Mashup songs
U2 songs
UK Singles Chart number-one singles